Kantipur English High School is an English-language high school in Nepal that has been established in 1983. It is situated in the province of Kathmandu.

The enrollment may be just below 1,000. The school motto is"Love, Learn & Serve".

Kantipur School's principal is Mrs. Subadra Shresta.

External links

 Kantipur English High School

Schools in Nepal
Educational institutions established in 1983
1983 establishments in Nepal